Memphis is the seventeenth album recorded by Roy Orbison, and his tenth for MGM Records. The album was released in November 1972.

History
The album took three weeks to make in March and April 1972. The album had one single, "Memphis, Tennessee", which became a minor hit in the US, charting at #84. Also included was a new, re-recorded version of Don Gibson's "I Can't Stop Loving You", which previously appeared on his 1960 album "Lonely and Blue". This was Orbison's final album that was released for London Records as Decca let Orbison out of their contract on June 30, 1972.

Track listing
Side one
"Memphis, Tennessee" – (Chuck Berry)
"Why A Woman Cries" – (Jerry McBee)
"Run, Baby Run (Back Into My Arms)" – (Joe Melson, Don Gant)
"Take Care of Your Woman" – (Jerry McBee)
"I'm The Man on Susie's Mind" – (Joe Melson, Glenn Barber)
"I Can't Stop Loving You" – (Don Gibson)
Side two
"Run The Engines Up High" – (Jerry McBee)
"It Ain't No Big Thing (But It's Growing)" – (Neal Merritt, Alice Joy Merritt, Shorty Hall)
"I Fought the Law" – (Sonny Curtis)
"The Three Bells" – (Jean Villard Gilles; English lyrics by Bert Reisfeld)
"Danny Boy" – (Frederick Weatherly)

Arranged by Joe Tanner
Produced by Joe Melson & Roy Orbison
except "Danny Boy" produced by Don Gant

Roy Orbison albums
1972 albums
MGM Records albums
Albums with cover art by Drew Struzan